Wasserbillig railway station is a railway station serving Wasserbillig, in the commune of Mertert, in eastern Luxembourg.  It is operated by Chemins de Fer Luxembourgeois, the state-owned railway company.

The station is situated on Line 30, which connects Luxembourg City to the east of the country and Trier.

External links
 Official CFL page on Wasserbillig station
 Rail.lu page on Wasserbillig station

Mertert
Railway stations in Luxembourg
Railway stations on CFL Line 30